Riccardo Collodel (born 10 November 1998) is an Italian professional footballer who plays as a midfielder for  club Siena.

Club career
Born in Borgomanero, Collodel started his career in Novara youth sector. For the 2017–18 season, he was loaned to Serie D club Fiorenzuola. Collodel played 36 Serie D matches.

On 23 August 2018, he was loaned again to Serie C club Vibonese. The player made his professional debut on 16 September 2018 against Bisceglie. He returned to Novara the next season, and played two years for the club.

On 10 July 2021, he signed with Serie B club Cremonese.

On 21 January 2022, he was loaned to Serie C club Lucchese.

On 22 July 2022, Collodel joined Siena.

References

External links
 
 

1998 births
Living people
Sportspeople from the Province of Novara
Footballers from Piedmont
Italian footballers
Association football midfielders
Serie C players
Serie D players
Novara F.C. players
U.S. Fiorenzuola 1922 S.S. players
U.S. Vibonese Calcio players
U.S. Cremonese players
Lucchese 1905 players
A.C.N. Siena 1904 players
People from Borgomanero